Mulanay, officially the Municipality of Mulanay,  is a 1st class municipality in the province of Quezon, Philippines. According to the 2020 census, it has a population of 55,576 people.

This place is situated on the Bondoc Peninsula; its geographical coordinates are 13° 31′ 20″ North, 122° 24′ 15″ East, and its original name was Malunay.

The town proper, with her plain landscape, is a coastal town facing the Tayabas Bay. The municipality is being considered to be listed in the tentative list for UNESCO World Heritage Site inscription due to its architectural marvels, notably its baroque church, its preserved ancestral houses, and the Limestone tombs of Kamhantik, a highly-significant Tagalog archaeological site and dambana, in the Buenavista Protected Landscape.

Etymology
Some legends would relate Mulanay to have derived its name from the Tagalog word Malunay, which means "Plenty of Lunay". Lunay is the vernacular term for Pili wax, which was abundant in the area.

History

The findings of the conducted archaeological exploration and excavation at Mt. Kamhantik Archaeological Site by the team from the National Museum headed by Dr. Eusebio Z. Dizon, Scientist III and a world renown archaeologist says Mulanay was inhabited by an organized community in the year 500AD-1300AD, who were our ancestors belonging to the Austronesian speaking people and originated from Taiwan (Peter Belwood).  Austronesian people or Austronesian-speaking people are various populations found in Asia, Oceania and Africa that speak languages of the Austronesian family. These include Taiwanese aborigines; the majority ethnic groups of Malaysia, East Timor, the Philippines, Indonesia, Brunei, Singapore, Madagascar, Micronesia, and Polynesia, as well as the Polynesian people of New Zealand and Hawaii, and the non-Papuan people of Melanesia.  The Austronesian language is a language family that is widely dispersed throughout Maritime Southeast Asia, Madagascar and the islands of the Pacific Ocean, with a few members on continental Asia. Austronesian languages are spoken by about 386 million people, making it the fifth-largest language family by number of speakers.

The result of the C-14 (carbon dating) on teeth found in burial No.5 at the Mt Kamhantik Archaeological Site was dated in the year 890AD or 1,220 years old (radio carbon dating result for sample IV2011F657AB,  BETA ANALYTIC INC. MIAMI, FLORIDA, USA). The recent archaeological investigation on July 15–30, 2015 found a surface archaeological artifact, stone tool. And according to Dr. Eusebio Z.  Dizon, Scientist III, it was a tool from the Neolithic period 10,000 BC-2,000 BC used for carving, cutting and sharpening.  Other artifacts found were potteries with incised designs which were similar to the early Huynh-Kalanay Potteries of Taiwan and Vietnam from the period of 1000 BCE and 200 CE.  Some were also present in the different areas in the Philippines like Sarangani, Cagayan, Isabela, Nueva Ecija, Bicol, Masbate and many others dating to 1000BC-300AD.  Ceramics shreds from the Sung Dynasty (960AD-1279AD) were are also found in the area.  These archaeological findings were evidences showing the participation of our ancestors from Mt. Kamhantik to a trade network in 500AD-1300AD.

The evangelization of Mulanay by the Franciscan Missionaries was in 1600 while its civil foundation as a municipality was effected in 1745 through the approval of the King of Spain.  During the Spanish regime, Mulanay was composed of the municipal territories of San Narciso, San Francisco, Catanauan and San Andres which was as big as the province of Bataan.  In 1755, Catanauan became a separate municipality followed by other remaining municipalities.  Mulanay's territorial jurisdiction was reduced to 42,000 hectares.  The original town of Mulanay composed of six (6) barangays was raided by the Moro pirates that led the town's executive together with the barangay heads to transfer the town site to the so-called Mayordomo, a sitio of Barangay Latangan.  After several years, raids along coastal areas were lessened.  The people returned to the town site, however, few barangay heads disagreed and left for Bantuin, Marinduque and Mindoro.

The populace of Mulanay is composed of different ethnic groups like Tagalogs, Visayas and Bicolanos. Based on the Philippine Statistics Authority Census Calendar Year 2010, it has a population of 50,826. The first town head of Mulanay during the Spanish Regime was Alcalde Mayor Eustaquio Manlangit, while the first town mayor during the American Occupation was Mayor Atanacio Ojeda.  The municipality had been under twenty seven mayors from Spanish Regime up to present.  The incumbent mayor is Aris Aguirre.

At present, Mulanay is composed of twenty eight (28) barangays, four of which comprise the poblacion. The municipality is an agricultural town where farm crops like coconut, garlic, bananas, rice, corn, peanuts, mongo, ginger, squash, and other vegetables are abundantly harvested.  Mulanay lies along the coast of Tayabas Bay, an abundant fishing ground.

Geography

Barangays
Mulanay is politically subdivided into 28 barangays.

Climate

Demographics

Economy

Government

Elected officials
Municipal council (2022 - 2025):
Mayor: Aris Aguirre
Vice-Mayor: Jay E. Castilleja
Councilors
Tinan Aguirre-Adao
Alex Morales
Emmanuel De Luna
Andy Baronia
Vicky Sarapat
Antonio Rodelas
Marcel Diaz
Rodil Rogel

Source: GMA News

Tourism
Amuguis Falls Amuguis Falls are located in Barangay Amuguis, Mulanay. With its own distinct and unique characteristics, waterfalls are undeveloped tourist destination. They are surrounded by forest trees and big rock formation where local folks usually go for picnics and gathering.

Malaking Bato The century-old legendary boulder along the coast of Barangay Santa Rosa which had been famous as a unique picnic spot among the residents and visitors alike.

Buenavista Protected Landscape A protected area situated in Barangay Buenavista that preserves a major watershed forest.

Limestone tombs of Kamhantik A thousand-year-old limestone-curved burial site of ancient people declared as a certified historical site by the National Museum of the Philippines. It is located within the Buenavista Protected Landscape. The site is a high-level dambana to Anitism adherents.

References

External links

Mulanay Profile at PhilAtlas.com
[ Philippine Standard Geographic Code]
Philippine Census Information
Local Governance Performance Management System

Municipalities of Quezon